HMCS Oshawa was a reciprocating engine-powered  built for the Royal Canadian Navy during the Second World War. Following the war, the ship was converted to an oceanographic research vessel and remained in this capacity until being scrapped in 1966.

Design and description
The ships' complement consisted of 85 officers and ratings.

The reciprocating ships had two vertical triple-expansion steam engines, each driving one shaft, using steam provided by two Admiralty three-drum boilers.

The Algerine class was armed with a QF  Mk V anti-aircraft gun and four twin-gun mounts for Oerlikon 20 mm cannon. The latter guns were in short supply when the first ships were being completed and they often got a proportion of single mounts. By 1944, single-barrel Bofors 40 mm mounts began replacing the twin 20 mm mounts on a one for one basis. All of the ships were fitted for four throwers and two rails for depth charges. Many Canadian ships omitted their sweeping gear in exchange for a 24-barrel Hedgehog spigot mortar and a stowage capacity for 90+ depth charges.

Construction and career
Oshawa was laid down on 6 October 1942 by Port Arthur Shipbuilding Co. Ltd at Port Arthur, Ontario. Named for the city of Oshawa, Ontario, the ship was launched on 10 June 1943 and commissioned into the Royal Canadian Navy on 6 July 1944 at Port Arthur.

Following her commissioning, the minesweeper sailed up the St. Lawrence River to Halifax, Nova Scotia. Oshawa was then sent to Bermuda to perform her work ups in September 1944. Upon her return, the ship was assigned to the Western Escort Force for convoy escort duties in the Battle of the Atlantic. Oshawa was made Senior Officer Ship of escort group W-6. As Senior Officer Ship, the commander of the escort would be aboard her during convoy missions. She remained with the group until it was disbanded in June 1945.

Following the group's disbandment, Oshawa was paid off and placed in reserve at Sydney, Nova Scotia. She was recommissioned on 24 October 1945 and transferred to the west coast, where the minesweeper was paid off into reserve again on 26 February 1946. She was recommissioned for the last time on 11 April 1956 after having been converted for oceanographic research and wore pennant 174 until paid off on 7 November 1958.

After her disposal by the Royal Canadian Navy, Oshawa continued as a civilian oceanographic research vessel. She remained in that role until the ship was sold and scrapped at Victoria, British Columbia in 1966.

See also
 List of ships of the Canadian Navy

References

Bibliography

External links
 Picture of HMCS Oshawa

 

Algerine-class minesweepers of the Royal Canadian Navy
Ships built in Ontario
1943 ships
World War II minesweepers of Canada
World War II escort ships of Canada
Cold War minesweepers of Canada